Default (lit. "National Bankruptcy Day") is a 2018 South Korean drama film directed by Choi Kook-hee. The film was released on November 28, 2018. Starring Kim Hye-soo, Yoo Ah-in, Heo Joon-ho, Jo Woo-jin, and Vincent Cassel, it is the first Korean film to feature a financial crisis theme based on real-life events.

Plot
Default dramatizes the behind-the-scenes story of the IMF negotiations that took place during the financial crisis in 1997 through three parallel stories.

Factory owner Gap-su (Huh Joon-ho) wins a contract to supply metal bowls to a big department store, but the store pays him with a promissory note — and so by accepting it, Gap-su unknowingly exposes himself to the risk that his customer won’t be able to pay him. This backfires when the department store goes bankrupt, leaving Gap-su without the funds to pay his suppliers.

Meanwhile, a young financial analyst named Jung-hak (Yoo Ah-in) hears stories on the radio about families in distress — particularly those selling their homes below market price to pay bills resulting from small business bankruptcies. Seeking to profit from this situation, Jung-hak sets up his own investment fund to bet against the Korean economy.

Finally, the governor of Korea’s central bank reads a report from his head of monetary policy, a woman named Si-hyun (Kim Hye-soo). Si-hyun’s report concludes that Korea will run out of foreign reserves to defend the Korean won’s artificially fixed exchange rate against the US dollar within a week. This triggers an emergency meeting of top government officials, who must defend the Korean economy from collapse.

These three stories show the 1997 financial crisis from different perspectives. Si-hyun’s story shows how the government acted during the crisis, Jung-hak’s narrative frames the downturn in economic terms, and Gap-su represents millions of real Korean small business owners who suffered in 1997. At each of these levels, Default embodies the trauma resulting from the crisis: we see characters desperate to sell their homes, drowning their sorrows in soju, and even committing suicide.

Cast

Main
 Kim Hye-soo as Han Shi-hyun
 A Senior financial analyst at the Bank of Korea who is striving to do the right thing during the seven days before the country is declared a liquidity crisis and sought the bailout programme from the IMF.
 Yoo Ah-in as Yoon Jung-hak
 A former banker who thinks the crisis is a lifetime chance for investment.
 Huh Joon-ho as Gab-soo
 Jo Woo-jin as Vice-Minister of the Ministry of Finance

Supporting
 Vincent Cassel as Managing Director of IMF
 Kim Hong-fa as New chief economist
 Um Hyo-sup as Former chief economist
 Song Young-chang as Old gentleman
 Kwon Hae-hyo as Chancellor
 Jo Han-chul as Lee Dae-hwan
 Ryu Deok-hwan as Orange
 Park Jin-joo as Kang Yoon-joo
 Jang Sung-bum as Park Jin
 Jeon Bae-soo as Young-bum
 Yeom Hye-ran as Hee-won
 Dong Ha as Third generation chaebol
 Kim Min-sang as Department head Lee
 Jung Kyu-soo as President Jung
 Kim Hyung-mook as Chief financial officer
 Seo Young-sam as Chief banking officer
 Kim Tae-yul as Hyun-soo
 Choi Joon-young as Hyun-soo (adult)
 Ryu Tae-ho as Chief presidential secretary
 Yoon Byung-hee as Manager Kim

Cameo appearance
 Lee Ho-jae as YS
 Han Ji-min as Lee Ah-ram

Production 
The read-through of the script occurred on December 7, 2017. Principal photography began on December 12, 2017.

Release 
The film was released in local cinemas on November 28, 2018. It was previously screened at the 71st Cannes International Film Festival's Marché du Film in May 2018. It was also screened at the 3rd International Film Festival & Awards Macau at the Special Presentations on December 9, 2018. Ahead of its local release, the film was sold to 17 territories including USA, Japan, Singapore, Taiwan, Indonesia, Hong Kong and Macao.

Reception

Box office 
On its opening day in South Korea, Default accumulated 301,324 viewers, taking nearly 40% of the box office and also taking the first place from Bohemian Rhapsody at the box office.

On the fifth day of its release, Default surpassed 1 million admissions, and during the first weekend of its release, Default garnered 1,573,441 viewers, securing the first place at the box office for its first weekend. Default became the highest November opening in the history of the Korean box office.

After topping the charts its first two weekends, it has since clocked up 3,755,233 admissions in its home country.

Critical response 
On Korean review aggregator Naver Movie Database, the film holds an approval rating of 6.50 from critic reviews and 8.74 from the audience. The Hollywood Reporter'''s Clarence Tsui called it "An engaging multi-strand story about a nation in turmoil", and wrote, "[...] director Choi Kook-hee has sought to fill that void in a dramatic and furious exposition of causes and effects as seen through the eyes of his three protagonists, who experience the crisis up close in different ways. [...] Choi and his screenwriter Eom Seong-min turn mind-boggling macroeconomic concepts into emotions aimed at the viewers' heart. On the downside, this tends to lead to the film defaulting toward the simplistic and melodramatic." Pierce Conran from Screen Anarchy'' suggested that, "The film borrows heavily from recent global financial thrillers, stirs in a predictable dose of melodrama and attempts to tackle women's equality", but concluded, "Technically the film is polished, but as it deliberately seeks to evoke a glum atmosphere it comes off as a little drab."

Awards and nominations

References

External links 

2010s Korean-language films
2018 drama films
South Korean drama films
CJ Entertainment films
Films about financial crises
Drama films based on actual events
Films set in the 1990s
Films set in South Korea
Films directed by Choi Kook-hee
Works about the International Monetary Fund
South Korean films based on actual events
2010s South Korean films